Margaret Thorn (née Anderson, 11 February 1897 – 10 February 1969) was a notable New Zealand bookkeeper, political activist and welfare worker. She was born in Manchester, Lancashire, England in 1897. She married the political activist and later Labour member of parliament Jim Thorn.

References

1897 births
1969 deaths
Social Democratic Party (New Zealand) politicians
New Zealand accountants
Politicians from Manchester
English emigrants to New Zealand
20th-century New Zealand politicians
20th-century New Zealand women politicians